Katrina Hacker (born May 31, 1990) is an American former figure skater. She placed sixth at the 2008 Four Continents and fifth at the 2009 World Junior Championships.

Career
Hacker won the novice-level bronze medal at the 2005 U.S. Championships and was then sent to the 2005 Triglav Trophy where she won the junior gold medal.

In the 2006–07 season, Hacker placed fifth at a Junior Grand Prix competition in Romania, her only JGP event. After not qualifying for the 2007 U.S. Championships, she decided to move to Boston in order to train with coaches Mark Mitchell and Peter Johansson at the Skating Club of Boston. She had a hip injury in summer 2007.

She subsequently won the 2008 New England Regionals and 2008 Eastern Sectionals. At the 2008 U.S. Championships, she placed 6th and was the third-highest-placing age-eligible skater for the senior World Championships. Hacker was not selected for Worlds—former World champion Kimmie Meissner received the third spot—but was selected for the 2008 Four Continents Championships, where she made her senior international debut. She was the top finisher among the American ladies at Four Continents.

In the 2008–09 season, Hacker received two senior Grand Prix assignments, the 2008 Cup of China and the 2008 NHK Trophy. She placed eighth in China and sixth in Japan. Hacker was assigned to the 2009 World Junior Championships and placed fifth. In May 2009, she said she would not compete in the 2009–10 season, and would instead focus on her studies.

Personal life 
In January 2008, Hacker was selected for the U.S. Figure Skating Scholastics Honors Team. She graduated from high school in spring 2008. She deferred her admission into Princeton University for a year to focus on her skating career. She is pursuing a PhD in clinical psychology at The New School. She identifies as queer.

Programs

Results

Detailed results

2008–2009 season

References

External links

 
 
 Katrina Hacker at Tracings.net

1990 births
American female single skaters
Living people
Sportspeople from New York City
21st-century American women